The 2016–17 Telesur Topklasse is the 84th season of top tier Suriname football league and 1st season of the Topklasse, the highest football league competition of Suriname. The season began in November 2016, and ended in June 2017. Telesur became official broadcaster and sponsor of the Topklasse before the start of this season.

Changes from 2015–16 

League expanded to 12 teams and changed names from Hoofdklasse to Topklasse. 
Excelsior and Takdier Boys relegated to Eerste Klasse now known as the Hoofdklasse.

Teams

Stadia and Locations 
''Note: Table lists in alphabetical order.

League table and results

Regular season

Championship decider

Top scorers

source: FIFA

Related competitions 

 2016-17 SVB Eerste Klasse
 2016-17 SVB Tweede Klasse
 2016-17 SVB Beker van Suriname
 2016-17 SVB President's Cup

References 

SVB Eerste Divisie seasons
1
Surinam